Thomas Martin Aloysius Burke KGCHS (January 10, 1840 – January 20, 1915) was an Irish-born clergyman of the Catholic Church. He served as Bishop of Albany from 1894 until his death in 1915.

Biography
Thomas Burke was born in Swinford, County Mayo, and came to the United States with his father, a physician, in 1850, settling in Utica, New York. He received his early education under the Christian Brothers in Utica, and attended St. Michael's College in Toronto, Ontario, Canada. In 1856, he entered St. Charles College in Ellicott City, Maryland, where he befriended his classmate James Gibbons. He completed his theological studies at St. Mary's Seminary in Baltimore.

Burke was ordained to the priesthood on June 30, 1864. He then served as a curate at St. John's Church in Albany until 1865, when he succeeded John J. Conroy as pastor of St. Joseph's Church in the same city. He became vicar general under Bishop Francis McNierney in 1887, and was named a Knight of the Holy Sepulchre in 1890.

On May 15, 1894, Burke was appointed the fourth Bishop of Albany by Pope Leo XIII. He received his episcopal consecration on the following July 1 from Archbishop Michael Corrigan, with Bishops Bernard John McQuaid and Patrick Anthony Ludden serving as co-consecrators, in the Cathedral of the Immaculate Conception. During his administration, he enlarged the Boys' Asylum in Albany, reduced diocesan debt, and renovated the cathedral.

He died in Albany at age 75.

References

External links
 
Biographical sketch from Vol. I, pp. 232–238 of Hudson-Mohawk Genealogical and Family Memoirs, edited by Cuyler Reynolds (New York: Lewis Historical Publishing Company, 1911).

1840 births
1915 deaths
19th-century Irish people
Roman Catholic bishops of Albany
Irish emigrants to the United States (before 1923)
20th-century Roman Catholic bishops in the United States
People from Swinford, County Mayo
19th-century Roman Catholic bishops in the United States
St. Charles College alumni
St. Mary's Seminary and University alumni
Knights of the Holy Sepulchre